was the 32nd Emperor of Japan, according to the traditional order of succession.

Sushun's reign spanned the years from 587 through 592.

Traditional narrative
Before his ascension to the Chrysanthemum Throne, his personal name (his imina) was Hatsusebe-shinnō, also known as Hatsusebe no Waka-sazaki.

He was the twelfth son of Emperor Kinmei.

He succeeded his half-brother, Emperor Yōmei in 587, and lived in the Kurahashi Palace (Kurahashi no Miya) in Yamato.

Shortly thereafter, Emperor Sushun is said to have acceded to the throne.

Sushun's contemporary title would not have been tennō, as most historians believe this title was not introduced until the reigns of Emperor Tenmu and Empress Jitō. Rather, it was presumably , meaning "the great king who rules all under heaven".

He came to the throne with the support of the Soga clan and Empress Suiko, his half sister and the widow of Emperor Bidatsu. Initially, the Mononobe clan, a rival clan of the Sogas, allied with Prince Anahobe, another son of Kimmei, and attempted to have him installed as Emperor. At the Battle of Shigisan, Soga no Umako, who succeeded his father as Ōomi of the Soga clan, eventually killed Mononobe no Moriya, the head of the Mononobe clan, which led to its decline. Umako then installed Emperor Sushun on the throne.

As time went on, Sushun eventually became resentful of Umako's power, and wanted him deposed. It is said that one day, he killed a wild boar and stated, "As I have slain this boar, so would I slay the one I despise". This angered Soga no Umako and, perhaps out of fear of being struck first, Umako hired  to assassinate Sushun in 592.

Emperor Sushun's reign lasted for five years before his death at the age of 72.

The actual site of Sushun's grave is known. The Emperor is traditionally venerated at a memorial Shinto shrine (misasagi) at Nara.

The Imperial Household Agency designates this location as Yōmei's mausoleum. It is formally named Kurahashi no oka no e no misasagi.

Genealogy
Sushun had two consorts and three Imperial children.

Consort (Hi) : , Otomo-no-Nukateko's daughter
Third Son: 

Beauty (Hin) : , Soga no Umako's daughter

Mother Unknown
, older brother of Prince Hachiko, Nakahara clan's ancestor

Concubine: , Mononobe no Moriya's younger sister

Ancestry

See also
 Emperor of Japan
 List of Emperors of Japan
 Imperial cult

Notes

References
 Aston, William George. (1896).  Nihongi: Chronicles of Japan from the Earliest Times to A.D. 697. London: Kegan Paul, Trench, Trubner. 
 Brown, Delmer M. and Ichirō Ishida, eds. (1979).  Gukanshō: The Future and the Past. Berkeley: University of California Press. ; 
 Jochi Daigaku. (1989).  Monumenta Nipponica, Vol. 44. Tokyo: Sophia University Press. 
 Ponsonby-Fane, Richard Arthur Brabazon. (1959).  The Imperial House of Japan. Kyoto: Ponsonby Memorial Society. 
 Titsingh, Isaac. (1834). Nihon Ōdai Ichiran; ou,  Annales des empereurs du Japon.  Paris: Royal Asiatic Society, Oriental Translation Fund of Great Britain and Ireland. 
 Varley, H. Paul. (1980).  Jinnō Shōtōki: A Chronicle of Gods and Sovereigns. New York: Columbia University Press. ; 

 
 

Japanese emperors
6th-century murdered monarchs
592 deaths
People of Asuka-period Japan
6th-century monarchs in Asia
6th-century Japanese monarchs
Year of birth unknown